Evgenios Zalokostas (1855–1919), was the foreign minister of Greece from October 10, 1916 to April 21, 1917.

References

Foreign ministers of Greece
1855 births
1919 deaths
Diplomats from Athens